Mark Davis (born January 15, 1987) is an American professional Olympian boxer, formerly an amateur boxer in the lightweight division.

Amateur career
Had a reported 200 amateur bout record.

Competed at the US Olympic Trials for the 2004 Olympics at 112 lbs beating Charles Huerta but losing to Ron Siler and then on a walkover to Aaron Alafa. Gold medalist at the 2005 US National championships at 57 kg beating Richard Baltazar and Ray Robinson and others. Won two contests for USA at 2005 World Cup at 57 kg. Competed at the 2005 World championships at 57 kg.

Won two bouts when representing United States vs. Belarus in 2006 at 57 kg. Won gold medal at the 2006 US championships at 57 kg. Won Eastern Olympic trials for 2008 Olympics at 57 kg.

Professional career
In 2011, Davis scored a TKO victory over the Dominican Republic’s Ramesis Gil when Gil was unable to answer the bell for round six.
Davis defeated Guillermo Sanchez of Buffalo via unanimous decision in Cleveland.

On July 2, 2014 Mark Davis underestimated his opponent, Michael Farenas of the Philippines (39-4-4 with 32 knockouts), and got stopped via TKO in round 8. Bringing an end to his undefeated record.

Professional boxing record

| style="text-align:center;" colspan="8"|16 Wins (5 knockouts, 0 decisions), 0 Losses, 0 Draws, 0 No Contests
|-
|align=center style="border-style: none none solid solid; background: #e3e3e3"|Result
|align=center style="border-style: none none solid solid; background: #e3e3e3"|Record
|align=center style="border-style: none none solid solid; background: #e3e3e3"|Opponent
|align=center style="border-style: none none solid solid; background: #e3e3e3"|Type
|align=center style="border-style: none none solid solid; background: #e3e3e3"|Round
|align=center style="border-style: none none solid solid; background: #e3e3e3"|Date
|align=center style="border-style: none none solid solid; background: #e3e3e3"|Location
|align=center style="border-style: none none solid solid; background: #e3e3e3"|Notes
|-align=center
|Win
|16–0
|align=left| Guillermo Sanchez
|
|10
|
|align=left|
|align=left|
|-align=center
|Win
|15–0
|align=left| Ramesis Gil
|
|
|
|align=left|
|align=left|
|-align=center
|Win
|14–0
|align=left| Justo Vallecillo
|
|4
|
|align=left|
|align=left|
|-align=center
|Win
|13–0
|align=left| Wayne Fletcher
|
|4
|
|align=left|
|align=left|
|-align=center
|Win
|12–0
|align=left| Steve Gonzalez
|
|8
|
|align=left|
|align=left|
|-align=center
|Win
|11–0
|align=left| Adauto Gonzalez
|
|8
|
|align=left|
|align=left|
|-align=center
|Win
|10–0
|align=left| Roberto Astacio
|
|8
|
|align=left|
|align=left|
|-align=center
|Win
|9–0
|align=left| Carl McNickles
|
|
|
|align=left|
|align=left|
|-align=center
|Win
|8–0
|align=left| Derrick Moon
|
|6
|
|align=left|
|align=left|
|-align=center
|Win
|7–0
|align=left| Jorge Ruiz
|
|6
|
|align=left|
|align=left|
|-align=center
|Win
|6–0
|align=left| Sadot Vazquez
|
|6
|
|align=left|
|align=left|
|-align=center
|Win
|5–0
|align=left| Ricky Alexander
|
|
|
|align=left|
|align=left|
|-align=center
|Win
|4–0
|align=left| Lee Griffith
|
|
|
|align=left|
|align=left|
|-align=center
|Win
|3–0
|align=left| Alberto Amaro
|
|4
|
|align=left|
|align=left|
|-align=center
|Win
|2–0
|align=left| Samuel Johnston
|
|
|
|align=left|
|align=left|
|-align=center
|Win
|1–0
|align=left| Guillerno Alonso
|
|4
|
|align=left|
|align=left|
|-align=center

Notes

External links

 

Boxers from Columbus, Ohio
African-American boxers
Lightweight boxers
1987 births
Living people
American male boxers
21st-century African-American sportspeople
20th-century African-American people